Union was a vessel acquired in 1796 by owners in Liverpool. Captain Archibald Galbraith sailed from Liverpool on 2 August 1796, bound for West Africa to engage in the triangular trade in enslaved people. Lloyd's List reported in March 1797 that a French squadron under "Renier" had captured , Thompson, master, Pearson, master, and Union, Galbraith, master, on the African Windward Coast. The French then gave Falmouth up to the crews.

The Liverpool merchant John Dawson was the or an owner of Brothers, Chaser, and Union.

Notes

Citations

References
 

1790s ships
Liverpool slave ships
Captured ships